Coleophora badiipennella is a moth of the family Coleophoridae described by Philogène Auguste Joseph Duponchel in 1843. It lives in Europe, from Fennoscandia to the Mediterranean Sea and from Great Britain to southern Russia, as well as North America.

It flies from June to July, depending on the location.

The larvae feed on Ulmus procera, Ulmus minor, Corylus, Prunus spinosa, Fraxinus and Acer. The mouth angle is 0-10°.

References

External links
 
 Coleophora badiipennella at UKMoths

badiipennella
Moths described in 1843
Moths of Europe
Moths of North America
Taxa named by Philogène Auguste Joseph Duponchel